, known by her stage name , was a Japanese film and television actress active primarily in the 1950s and 1960s. She made her film debut in 1947 and starred in several of Akira Kurosawa's early films such as Drunken Angel (1948), The Quiet Duel (1949), Stray Dog (1949), Scandal (1950), The Idiot (1951) and Seven Samurai (1954).

References

External links

Japanese film actresses
Japanese television actresses
Actresses from Tokyo
1922 births
2012 deaths